The Melbourne International Film Festival (MIFF) is an annual film festival held over three weeks in Melbourne, Australia. It was founded in 1952 and is one of the oldest film festivals in the world following the founding of the Venice Film Festival in 1932, Cannes Film Festival in 1939 and Berlin Film Festival in 1951. Originally launched at Olinda outside Melbourne in 1952 as the Olinda Film Festival, in 1953, the event was renamed the Melbourne Film Festival. It held this title over many decades before transforming in the Melbourne International Film Festival. MIFF is one of Melbourne's four major film festivals, in addition to the Melbourne International Animation Festival (MIAF), Melbourne Queer Film Festival (MQFF) and Melbourne Underground Film Festival (MUFF). Erwin Rado (1914 - 1988) was the Melbourne Film Festival's iconic director appointed in 1956. The Australian Dictionary of Biography notes Mr Rado was the Festival's first paid director and also shaped its character with his 'uncompromising drive for excellence'. He served as MIFF Director until 1980, returning to stage the 1983 event. Other notable Directors include Tait Brady, Sandra Sdraulig, James Hewison, Artistic Director Michelle Carey and current AD, Al Cossar appointed 2018.

History
Established in 1952, the Melbourne International Film Festival (MIFF) is one of the oldest film festivals in the world and has become the most notable screen event in Australia. An iconic Melbourne event, the festival takes place annually in various theatres in the Melbourne CBD, presenting an acclaimed screening program including films from local and international filmmakers, alongside industry events.

Overview
MIFF is the largest film festival in both Australia and the southern hemisphere, and is Australia's largest showcase of new Australian cinema. The 2012 festival generated A$8 million for the Victorian economy.

As of 2013, the festival is accredited by the American Academy of Motion Picture Arts and Sciences, the Australian Film Institute and the British Academy of Film and Television Arts.

As of 2013, the festival's CEO is Maria Amato, Carey is the Artistic Director and Mark Woods is MIFF's Industry Director/Executive Producer.

Program

In 2013, the festival program consisted of the following categories:

International Panorama - a handpicked selection of world cinema
TeleScope – curated program of 12 new films from 12 European Union countries
Australian Showcase – new Australian cinema
NextGen - a program of films aimed at younger audiences
Accent on Asia - showcase of films from Asia-Pacific region
Inside the DPRK - two film exploring life within North Korea
Juche Showtime: Films of the DPRK - North Korean cinema
Defying the Times: Activism on Film – films on political activism
Documentaries
A League of Their Own: New Arabic Cinema – films from the pan-Arabic world
States of Play: American Independents – independent cinema from the United States
Masters and Restorations – documentaries on filmmaking and film restorations
Backbeat – music films
Animation
Shining Violence: Italian Giallo – films of the Italian 'giallo' subgenre
Night Shift – thriller, horror and gore movies
This Sporting Life – sporting films
Short Film Packages – short film category that features the Accelerator programs (emerging filmmakers), Best MIFF Shorts Screening (best short films of the festival selected by the MIFF Shorts Awards Jury) and the MIFF Shorts Awards Ceremony (see: #Film Competitions)
Pre-Feature Shorts – short films featured prior to feature film screenings
Special Events – includes the opening night feature film and a screening at the Melbourne Planetarium
Talking Pictures – discussion and Q&A events with the festival's filmmakers and personalities
MIFF Premiere Fund – Australian films supported by the MIFF Premiere Fund
37ºSouth - see: #37ºSouth Market

Venues

The festival is conducted across various venues located in Melbourne and in 2013 the following venues were used: Australian Centre for the Moving Image, Forum Theatre, Greater Union Cinemas, Mandala Festival Wine Bar, Hoyts Melbourne Central, the Arts Centre Melbourne, Kino Cinemas, Wheeler Centre, Village Roadshow Theatrette, and Speakeasy Cinema.

37ºSouth Market
The 37ºSouth Market is the only international film financing marketplace to take place during a film festival in Australia or New Zealand (NZ). The event occurs during the opening days of the festival and is a forum for around 45 invited sales agents/distributors to meet with up to 100 pre-selected Australian and NZ producers who are seeking co-financing support. As of 2013, the 37ºSouth Market is also the exclusive partner of the London's Production Finance Market (PFM) for Australia and NZ. As of 2013, the 37ºSouth Market has attracted companies such as: Studio Canal, Wild Bunch, Paramount Pictures, BBC Films, HanWay, Independent, Miramax Films, Visit, Bankside, The Works, eOne, Cargo, West End, Aver, Level K.

Film Competitions
Since 1962, MIFF has staged a short film competition, as well as numerous feature film award categories. It also presents audience popularity awards for feature film and documentary. The festival's inaugural award was 'Best Short Film', but the title was changed to 'Grand Prix for Best Short Film' in 1965. From 1985 onwards, the Grand Prix has been officially presented by the City of Melbourne.

Feature film awards
People's Choice Award for Best Feature
People's Choice Award for Best Documentary
TeleScope Best European Feature Award
The Age Critics' Award (presented by The Age newspaper)

Short film awards
City of Melbourne Grand Prix for Best Short Film (A$10,000)
Film Victoria Erwin Rado Award for Best Australian Short Film (A$7,000)
Swinburne Award for Emerging Australian Filmmaker (A$5,000)
Cinema Nova Award for Best Fiction Short Film (A$5,000)
Holmesglen Award for Best Animation Short Film (A$5,000)
BBC Knowledge Award for Best Documentary Short Film (A$5,000)
The Astor Theatre Award for Best Experimental Short Film (A$5,000)
Jury Special Mention

As of 2013, the MIFF short film awards are accredited by the Academy of Motion Picture Arts and Sciences, the British Academy of Film and Television Arts (BAFTA) and the Australian Academy of Cinema and Television Arts (AACTA), and winners in the Best Short, Best Fiction, Best Animation and Best Documentary categories are eligible to submit their films for Academy Award consideration. The judges for the 2013 MIFF short film awards were Lorin Clarke, Michael Matrenza and Ramona Telecican.

Winners of Grand Prix for Best Short Film

Controversies

Breakaway film festival (2000)
In 2000, MIFF's rejection of a feature film written and directed by Richard Wolstencroft led him to form the Melbourne Underground Film Festival (MUFF). In subsequent years, MUFF has attracted controversy by criticising the content of MIFF, as well as its management, specifically the leadership of former directors. MUFF sees itself as a space for exciting and edgy Australian cinema that may not be played at MIFF.

Looking for Eric (2009)
In June 2009, Ken Loach, Paul Laverty (writer) and Rebecca O'Brien (producer) pulled their film Looking for Eric from the festival because the Israeli Embassy was a sponsor and the festival declined to withdraw their sponsorship. Moore compared Loach's tactics to blackmail, stating that "we will not participate in a boycott against the State of Israel, just as we would not contemplate boycotting films from China or other nations involved in difficult long-standing historical disputes".

Uyghur film (2009)
During the 58th festival in 2009, the film The 10 Conditions of Love (2009), which documents the life of the exiled Uyghur leader Rebiya Kadeer, was screened despite many attempts by the Government of China to have the film withdrawn from the festival. Chinese filmmakers withdrew their films from the festival two days before it opened on 24 July 2009. Former MIFF director Richard Moore refused to remove the film from the festival program, despite the hacking of the festival website and attempts to hack its online ticketing system from IP addresses of Chinese origin. Later, both pro-Chinese and pro-Uyghur activists attempted to disrupt ticketing due to the media coverage. The Chinese Government contacted Robert Doyle, the Lord Mayor of Melbourne asking him to intervene, but he refused. Australia's Ambassador to China Geoff Raby was summoned by China's Deputy Foreign Minister Zhang Zhijun to express displeasure about Kadeer's attendance at MIFF.

Victoria Police was placed on alert during the screening of the film and Pro-Uighur demonstrators also gathered outside the Melbourne Town Hall, and the Dalai Lama sent a message of support via Michael Danby, the MP for Melbourne Ports:

See also
Film festival
List of film festivals
List of short film festivals
St Kilda Short Film Festival
Cinema of Australia

References

External links
 

Film festivals in Melbourne
Film festivals established in 1951
1951 establishments in Australia